In Bayesian probability, the Jeffreys prior, named after Sir Harold Jeffreys, is a non-informative (objective) prior distribution for a parameter space; its density function is proportional to the square root of the determinant of the Fisher information matrix:

 

It has the key feature that it is invariant under a change of coordinates for the parameter vector . That is, the relative probability assigned to a volume of a probability space using a Jeffreys prior will be the same regardless of the parameterization used to define the Jeffreys prior.  This makes it of special interest for use with scale parameters.

Reparameterization

One-parameter case

Since the Fisher information transforms under reparametrization as 

Multiple-parameter case

We call the prior  "invariant" under reparametrization if

where  is the Jacobian matrix with entries

Since the Fisher information matrix transforms under reparametrization as 

we have that

Attributes
From a practical and mathematical standpoint, a valid reason to use this non-informative prior instead of others, like the ones obtained through a limit in conjugate families of distributions, is that the relative probability of a volume of the probability space is not dependent upon the set of parameter variables that is chosen to describe parameter space.

Sometimes the Jeffreys prior cannot be normalized, and is thus an improper prior. For example, the Jeffreys prior for the distribution mean is uniform over the entire real line in the case of a Gaussian distribution of known variance.

Use of the Jeffreys prior violates the strong version of the likelihood principle, which is accepted by many, but by no means all, statisticians. Accordingly, the Jeffreys prior, and hence the inferences made using it, may be different for two experiments involving the same  parameter even when the likelihood functions for the two experiments are the same—a violation of the strong likelihood principle.

Minimum description length

In the minimum description length approach to statistics the goal is to describe data as compactly as possible where the length of a description is measured in bits of the code used. For a parametric family of distributions one compares a code with the best code based on one of the distributions in the parameterized family. The main result is that in exponential families, asymptotically for large sample size, the code based on the distribution that is a mixture of the elements in the exponential family with the Jeffreys prior is optimal. This result holds if one restricts the parameter set to a compact subset in the interior of the full parameter space. If the full parameter is used a modified version of the result should be used.

Examples
The Jeffreys prior for a parameter (or a set of parameters) depends upon the statistical model.

Gaussian distribution with mean parameter
For the Gaussian distribution of the real value 
 
with  fixed, the Jeffreys prior for the mean  is
 
That is, the Jeffreys prior for  does not depend upon ; it is the unnormalized uniform distribution on the real line — the distribution that is 1 (or some other fixed constant) for all points. This is an improper prior, and is, up to the choice of constant, the unique translation-invariant distribution on the reals (the Haar measure with respect to addition of reals), corresponding to the mean being a measure of location and translation-invariance corresponding to no information about location.

Gaussian distribution with standard deviation parameter
For the Gaussian distribution of the real value 
 
with  fixed, the Jeffreys prior for the standard deviation  is
 
It is the unique (up to a multiple) prior (on the positive reals) that is scale-invariant (the Haar measure with respect to multiplication of positive reals), corresponding to the standard deviation being a measure of scale and scale-invariance corresponding to no information about scale. As with the uniform distribution on the reals, it is an improper prior.

Poisson distribution with rate parameter
For the Poisson distribution of the non-negative integer ,
 
the Jeffreys prior for the rate parameter  is
 

Bernoulli trial
The Jeffreys prior for the parameter  is

 

Furthermore, if  then

Equivalently,  is uniform on the whole circle .

N-sided die with biased probabilities
This amounts to using a pseudocount of one half for each possible outcome.

References

Further reading 
 
 

Bayesian statistics